Argyresthia bergiella is a moth of the  family Yponomeutidae. It is found in most of Europe, except Ireland, Great Britain, Belgium, the Iberian Peninsula and most of the Balkan Peninsula.

The wingspan is 11–12 mm.

The larvae feed on Picea abies and Pinus species.

References

Argyresthia
Moths of Europe
Moths described in 1840
Taxa named by Julius Theodor Christian Ratzeburg